Lasius reginae is a species of ant in the genus Lasius. It is native to Austria.

References

reginae
Hymenoptera of Europe
Insects described in 1967
Taxonomy articles created by Polbot